Ultra.Kultura was a Russian counterculture book publisher.

History
In 2003, Ilya Kormiltsev founded publishing house Ultra.Kultura and managed it as the editor-in-chief since 2003 until his death in 2007. Ultra.Kultura became notorious in 2004, when Russian authorities accused it with propaganda of drug use and terrorism. In 2006, all copies of the combined Ultra.Kultura edition of Adam Parfrey's Apocalypse Culture and Apocalypse Culture II were sought by authorities, and most were seized and submitted to flames, owing to the book's inclusion of an essay by David Woodard that was alleged to promote recreational ketamine use.

Series
 overdrive - "radical" fiction 
 russkiy drive - books of young Russian authors
 non-fiction - books dealing with acute social issues (terrorism, drugs)
 cybertime - books about information technology
 ЖZЛ -  books about leading figures of the counterculture
 Klassenkampf - opinion journalism
 ultra.fiction - fiction books

Authors
Ultra.Kultura was known for publishing "controversial" authors and books related to far-left and far-right extremism. Ultra.Kultura published essays of National Bolshevik Party leader Eduard Limonov when he was imprisoned.

Other notable authors include :

Blanche Barton
Melvin Burgess
William S. Burroughs
Nick Cave
Geydar Dzhemal
Bret Easton Ellis
Susan George
William Gibson
Che Guevara
Boris Kagarlitsky
Lydia Lunch
Huey P. Newton
Howard Marks
Hubert Selby, Jr.
Adam Parfrey
William Luther Pierce
Abel Posse
Alexander Prokhanov
Israel Shamir
Gene Sharp
Subcomandante Marcos
Alexander Tarasov

See also
Freedom of the press in Russia

References

External links
 Ultra.Kultura - official website
 Ultra.Kultura 2.0 - official website

Publishing companies established in 2003
Book publishing companies of Russia